Manawar is a town with tehsil in Dhar district in the Indian state of Madhya Pradesh. The name Manawar came from name of river Mān that flows at southern edge of the town. Pin code of Manawar is 454446.

Geography
It has an average elevation of 180 metres (590 feet). It lies in Narmada Valley.

Nearest Railway station and airport is Indore which is 129 km from Manawar. National Highway 3 is 50 km from Manawar.

Demographics

As of the 2011 Census of India, Manawar had a population of 30,393. Males constitute 51% of the population and females 49%. Manawar has an average literacy rate of 63%, lower than the national average of 74.04%: male literacy is 68%, and female literacy is 58.7%. In Manawar, 13.5% of the population is under 6 years of age.

Places
Some of the religious places in Manawar are Rajendra Suri Jain Dadawadi, Gayatri Mandir, Shri Jageshwar Mandir, Shri Banknath Mahadev Mandir, Shri Mangla Devi Mandir, Shri Parshvanath Jain Mandir, Shri Manta Ganesh Mandir and Shri Balipurwale Baba Mandir.

The Ashram of famous saint Shri Balipurwale Babaji, is located in Balipur, Tehsil-Manawar. It is a religious and peaceful city.

Business and Lifestyle
Surrounded by around 60 villages, business is mainly dependent on Agriculture. Most grown crops include Soybean, Cotton, Wheat and Red Chilli. It is known as the Business City of Dhar district. Festivals like Diwali, Dussehra, Raksha Bandhan, Eid, Holi, Guru Saptami are celebrated with joy and excitement. For scenic beauty, people prefer Man Dam Garden as Picnic spot.

References

Cities and towns in Dhar district